Ana Roxana Lehaci (born 11 August 1990) is an Austrian canoeist. She competed in the women's K-2 500 metres event at the 2016 Summer Olympics.

References

External links
 

1990 births
Living people
Austrian female canoeists
Olympic canoeists of Austria
Canoeists at the 2016 Summer Olympics
Place of birth missing (living people)
European Games competitors for Austria
Canoeists at the 2019 European Games
Canoeists at the 2020 Summer Olympics
20th-century Austrian women
21st-century Austrian women